Münchener Freiheit (known sometimes simply as Freiheit) is a German pop and rock band that had released nineteen studio albums by 2016, four of which have gone gold. They are named after a square in the city of Munich in Germany, meaning "Munich freedom". It is considered part of the Neue Deutsche Welle musical movement.

They are best known in the English-speaking world for their single "Keeping the Dream Alive". This song became a #14 hit single in the UK Singles Chart when released in December 1988, making Münchener Freiheit a one-hit wonder there.

The early years
The band, composed of Stefan Zauner (vocals, keyboards), Aron Strobel (guitar and vocals), Rennie Hatzke (drums), Michael Kunzi (bass and vocals), and Alex Grünwald (keyboard), formed in the early 1980s. Their first album Umsteiger, released in 1982, was a rough-around-the-edges form of new wave showing an aggressive side to Zauner's otherwise smooth vocals. This was followed a year later by Licht, which took them in a more synthpop direction. The band's next album Herzschlag einer Stadt in 1984 was a more commercial new wave record which spawned a Top 30 hit in Germany, "Oh Baby".

Breakthrough
Living up to its title, the album contained a selection of new singles, a previously unreleased live version of "Zeig mir die Nacht" (from Umsteiger), two remixes and the occasional track from their previous two albums.

The international years
Following the success of Von Anfang an and its follow-up, the band aimed for international success and began recording tracks from both albums in English. The result was Romancing in the Dark, containing English version of six tracks from Traumziel plus their three biggest German hits. On this and subsequent English-language albums, the band was credited simply as Freiheit. The majority of the English lyrics were written by the band themselves with some assistance from outside lyricists. (Later the band relied on English lyrics written by professional lyricists Tim Touchton and Curtis Briggs.) The album was released throughout Europe, and there were big hits in Greece (where "Every Time" was a number one single), Sweden, Norway and the Netherlands.

In 1988, Münchener Freiheit released Fantasie in Germany and its English counterpart, Fantasy. Unlike Romancing in the Dark, Fantasy contained all tracks from its German counterpart. The album went un-noticed throughout the US but was moderately successful in Europe. Freiheit never again released an English album in the US. However, in their homeland, Fantasie was a great success spending eight weeks in the Top 10 peaking at number four and spawning two Top 15 singles: "So lang' man Träume noch leben kann" and "Bis wir uns wiederseh'n". "Keeping the Dream Alive" is the English-language version of "So lang' man Träume noch leben kann". This single became the band's sole hit in the UK, reaching number 14 in the UK singles chart in December 1988.

Their follow-up, Purpurmond, was the last album to be re-recorded in English under the title Love is No Science. Nine of its eleven tracks were re-recorded in English, along with a second re-recording of "Tausendmal Du", this time entitled "All I Can Do".

1991 to present
Although 1991 was a quiet year for the band, Zauner and Strobel were still active, releasing the album Living in the Sun under the name of Deuces Wild. The album was recorded in English with most of the lyrics written by Tim Touchton, who had worked with the band since Fantasy.

Despite the moderate reception of Purpurmond, the band returned to the German Top 10 in 1992 with Liebe auf den ersten Blick, earning a Top 15 hit with the title track. The band also represented their country in the 1993 Eurovision Song Contest, finishing in 18th place with their song, "Viel zu weit". The band returned a year later with the album Energie (1994), which gave them another Top 30 album in Germany, although their next two albums, Entführ' mich (1996) and Schatten (1998; with a sleeve design by Klaus Voormann), failed to chart at all.

Leaving Sony Music for the EastWest label, the band moved towards conventional dance-pop on their next album, Freiheit die ich meine (2000). The album saw the band re-enter the German Top 50 following their two album absence. The band changed labels again to Koch International, releasing the albums Wachgeküsst (2002) and Geile Zeit (2004). Although these albums used a similar 'radio-friendly' formula to Freiheit die ich meine, both albums peaked in the lower regions of the German Top 100.

Münchener Freiheit continue to record and tour, celebrating their 25th anniversary with the Double CD retrospective Alle Jahre, Alle Hits (2005) and a new single, "Du bist das Leben". Stefan Zauner left the band in 2012 to pursue producing solo-albums; his latest CD is Zeitgefühl (2012). Tim Wilhelm replaced Zauner as a singer in the band.

Discography

German-language studio albums

German-language live albums

German-language compilations

German-language singles

Other German non-charting singles

English-language studio albums
1987: Romancing in the Dark 
1988: Fantasy 
1990: Love is No Science

English-language singles

Others
 "Every Time" (NO-5 SE-15)
 "Play It Cool" (NO-10 SE-17 NL-4)
 "Baby It's You" 
 "Back to the Sunshine"
 "Kissed You in the Rain"
 "Diana" 
 "All I Can Do"

Notes 
 Universal-music.de: Tim Wilhelm ist neuer Sänger der Münchener Freiheit, 1 March 2012.

References

External links 
 
 

Eurovision Song Contest entrants for Germany
Eurovision Song Contest entrants of 1993
German musical groups
Musical groups established in 1980
Musical groups from Munich
Hansa Records artists